Cyperus haspan is a dwarf papyrus sedge in the Cyperaceae. It is widely distributed in tropical and subtropical regions in Africa, Madagascar, southern Asia (Iran, India, China, Philippines, Indonesia, etc.), New Guinea, Australia, South America, West Indies, Central America, southern Mexico and the southeastern United States (from Texas to Virginia).

Description
It blooms between Summer and Spring producing brown flowers.

In Western Australia it is found in wet areas in the Kimberley region where it grows in gravelly sandy-clay alluvium.

There are two recognised subspecies:
Cyperus haspan L. subsp. haspan	
Cyperus haspan subsp. juncoides (Lam.) Kük.

References

haspan
Plants described in 1753
Taxa named by Carl Linnaeus
Flora of Africa
Flora of Australia
Flora of New Guinea
Flora of South America
Flora of North America
Flora of Asia